John Rettie "Jock" McKernan Jr. (born May 20, 1948) is an American politician who served two terms as the 71st Governor of Maine, from 1987 to 1995.

Born in Bangor, Maine, McKernan attended Dartmouth College and then the University of Maine School of Law. A Republican, McKernan was a member of the U.S. House of Representatives before becoming governor.  He also served in the state house from 1973 to 1977 and was a delegate to the Republican National Conventions in 1976 and 1984.

Early life
John McKernan was born in Bangor, Maine, in May 1948, the son of Barbara Guild McKernan and John R. McKernan, Sr. He grew up there, attending public schools in the Bangor school system all the way through high school.  After graduating, McKernan attended Dartmouth College in Hanover, New Hampshire, where he received his bachelor's degree in 1970.

He then returned to Maine and joined the Maine Army National Guard, in which he served from 1970 until 1973. During this time, he moved to Portland, Maine, to pursue graduate studies at the University of Maine School of Law. He completed his J.D. degree in 1974, while already serving in the Maine House of Representatives.

Maine House of Representatives (1973–77) 
McKernan's first entry into politics was being elected to the Maine House of Representatives in 1972.  He did so as one of the youngest ever to serve in that capacity, being only 24 years old.

He was later elected to a second term, where his colleagues selected him as assistant Republican floor leader.

He left the state legislature in 1976 to begin practicing law at a Portland law firm.

Congressman (1983–87) 
McKernan was twice elected to the United States House of Representatives, in 1982 and 1984.

While he served in the House, he had the unusual distinction of dating the other member of Maine's House delegation – Olympia Snowe. The two had met while they had earlier served in the Maine House of Representatives, and began dating in 1978.  During their time together in Congress, McKernan and Snowe had nearly identical voting records.  Their similar feelings on issues even translated into reversals of opinion – for example, they both switched from opposing aid to the Nicaraguan rebels to later supporting such aid.  While their relationship was widely known, it was not reported much by the Maine press.

McKernan retired from Congress to run for governor in 1986, and was sworn in as governor in January 1987.

Governor of Maine (1987–95)

1986 election and first term 

Before the 1986 election, no Republican had occupied the Blaine House in two decades.  Incumbent governor Joseph E. Brennan was term limited and could not run again. McKernan immediately declared his intention to run for governor, and Brennan declared his candidacy for McKernan's old congressional seat in the first district (which he would eventually win).

His opponent was James E. Tierney, former Majority Leader of the Maine House and state Attorney General – though he did also face two independent candidates, Sherry Huber and John Menario.  He based his campaign on better schools and better jobs, believing them to be the keys to making Maine (in his words) "the very best place in America to live, to work and to raise a family." He pledged to pursue both goals without a major tax increase.  Additionally, McKernan focused on economic development, claiming that Maine can become what he dubbed "the opportunity state". After a spirited campaign, McKernan emerged on top, besting Tierney by a nine-point margin. However, McKernan received only 39% of the vote in a divided four-way race.

McKernan, just 38 years old on inauguration day, was welcomed with a $46-million surplus. That good financial news would be short-lived, however, as the state would face a number of fiscal challenges in the coming years.

In his first tenure in Augusta, McKernan attempted to grow the Maine economy. He helped initiate a $1.35-million fund to create "centers of innovation," designed to position Maine at the cutting edge of the next technological change. He also worked to expand job training programs, structured to enable the state to quickly change the skills being taught to meet the needs of a new employer. An additional $5.9-million state investment in the University of Maine System was also spearheaded by the governor, intended to enhance its educational and research reputation. These efforts were hammered home with the governor's new economic development slogan: "MAINE: We're America's Future Business." The program created "opportunity zones" throughout the state to draw jobs to areas in need of new or additional industry.

In his second year in office, Governor McKernan launched a public relations campaign intended to enhance the state's image as a place to do business.

For all the work to develop Maine's economy, McKernan also faced a number of difficulties which stunted his efforts. Budget shortfalls began to run rampant toward the end of his term, and legislative battles with opposition Democrats became frequent. The relationship between longtime Speaker of the House John L. Martin and McKernan was poisonous, and the two had difficulty resolving differences over the state budget. The Governor crafted a plan to eliminate or reduce welfare and job-training benefits for thousands of low-income Mainers, while Martin and the Democrats fought to keep funding at a higher level.

The difficult budget fights between the governor and the legislature would prove to be a major issue in McKernan's effort to be re-elected.

1990 election and second term 
During his announcement for his re-election campaign, McKernan listed as important successes growth management initiative, a trash reduction and recycling program, and a plan to remove the Kennebec River dam in Augusta by the end of the 1990s.  McKernan credited his administration with taking decisive action against illegal drugs, citing the creation of the Bureau of Intergovernmental Drug Enforcement. Troubled by difficult financial issues, McKernan reiterated his claim that Maine has responded to budget difficulties with less impact on taxpayers than other states in the New England region. McKernan pointed out that Maine was the only state in the Northeast that has a balanced budget and that did it without raising taxes.
–
Polling in May 1990 showed former governor Joseph Brennan with a 9-point lead over the incumbent governor. McKernan felt that the erosion of his support occurred during the legislative budget battles, and would be reversed in the months before the election, believing that the situation would improve as the state budget continued to hold further into the fiscal year.

The race was so close that the candidates waited until shortly before noon the following day before summoning reporters to make acceptance and concession remarks.  Brennan acknowledged that voter margins in his traditional strongholds in southern Maine weren't enough to offset McKernan's strength in rural and northern Maine.

McKernan has characterized his narrow victory as something of a comeback, considering that pollsters showed him 12 points behind Brennan only two months prior. Momentum began to change only in mid-October, McKernan said, when his campaign was able to effectively communicate "not only what we had accomplished but also what was at stake in this election." Brennan said that he saw no fatal flaws in his campaign, but added he was hurt by the long federal budget debate that kept him in Washington when he needed to be campaigning in Maine. "It hurts the dynamic of the campaign when you can't be here," he explained.

McKernan's second term became defined by partisan battles with the state legislature's Democratic majority over fiscal management, given a large budget deficit and a constitution that prohibited borrowing to offset budget gaps. He threatened to invoke a 1976 law permitting the governor to make "fair and equitable" spending reductions to comply with the state's balanced-budget mandate. His specific controversial actions included drafting plans to cut spending unilaterally and rewriting rules to give state agencies more discretion in how they allocate their reduced funds. Democrats objected and took McKernan to the Maine Supreme Judicial Court, but the court upheld the governor's authority to take such action.

McKernan also battled with Democrats about state workmen's compensation costs, eventually settling with them for a roughly 26% decrease in spending.

Legacy In Maine 
When participating in a forum after his governorship was over, McKernan spoke at length about a number of things he felt were successes in his tenure, as well as his own personal disappointments.

According to McKernan, his most prominent milestone was preparing the state for a global economy.  He made note that during his stewardship, Maine competed not just with other states, but globally in such countries as Malaysia and Hong Kong. He also mentioned enhancing the state's business climate and workers compensation reforms as significant achievements.

At the same time, he stated that while he was governor, Maine was at the "highest of the highs and the lowest of the lows," economically. He felt that this unpredictability prevented him from being able to forecast a dramatic downturn in state revenues toward the latter part of his time in office, and said that it was his biggest lament.

McKernan's legacy is conflicted. His political party never controlled either branch of the state legislature, so his administration became defined by bitter battles between the Blaine House and the State House. McKernan and the Democratic leadership (particularly John Martin) fostered an extremely hostile and adversarial climate that consumed almost every aspect of Maine government in the late 1980s and early 1990s. The wounds of those conflicts still run deep to this day, as McKernan has made repeated references to the scarred relationship between the two men since leaving office.

Post-government life 
 Honorary state chairman for John McCain's presidential campaign in Maine.
 Served as outside director of ImmuCell Corporation since 1995.
 He became chief executive officer of Education Management Corporation, the parent company of several for-profit colleges, on September 1, 2003, where he served until 2006. He now serves as executive chairman.

Personal life and family 
McKernan has been married twice. His first marriage was to Judith Files. They had one child together,  Peter McKernan, but the couple subsequently divorced in 1978. On January 23, 1991, Peter died of a previously undetected heart problem after lying in a coma for nine days.  He had collapsed during baseball practice at Dartmouth College. He was 20 years old at the time, played junior varsity baseball at Dartmouth and had recently joined the school's Beta Theta Pi fraternity.

In 1989, McKernan married eventual U.S. Senator Olympia Snowe after the two had been dating for roughly six years. McKernan and Snowe met while serving in the Maine House of Representatives and again served together in the U.S. House of Representatives from 1983 to 1987.

Electoral history

References

External links
 

|-

|-

|-

|-

1948 births
Living people
American businesspeople
Dartmouth College alumni
Education Management Corporation
Republican Party governors of Maine
Maine lawyers
Maine National Guard personnel
Republican Party members of the Maine House of Representatives
Military personnel from Maine
People from Falmouth, Maine
Politicians from Bangor, Maine
Republican Party members of the United States House of Representatives from Maine
Spouses of Maine politicians
United States Army personnel
University of Maine School of Law alumni